Denise "DeDe" Lopez is a Mexican born Swedish singer, rapper, and DJ. She participated in Melodifestivalen 2003

Discography
Albums
TBA (Totally Bombastic Anecdotes) (1995)
I Do (1997)
Metaphor (1999)
Like a Queen (Japan) (2002)
Slave to the Sound (2003)
Gemini 1994–2004 (2004)
Black Lace & Leather (2011)
Revolution (2021)
Hide & Seek (2022) New release of Black Lace & Leather

Singles
"My Crush" (1993)
"Silly Games" (1993)
"Take A Step Back" (1995)
"Party" (1995)
"In The Mood" (1996)
"(Can We) Swing It" (1996)
"My Lover" (1997)
"Get to You" (1997)
"Gimme All You Got" (1997)
"Everybody" (1999)
"Let Me Show You How" (1999)
"Lita På Mig" feat Blues (2001)
"Someone Somewhere Someday" (2003)
"Love Me Down" (2003)
"Last To Know" feat Laila Adele (2003)
"Tarzan Boy" (2005)
"B.I.T.C.H (Being In Total Control Of Herself)" (2007)
"Turn You On" feat Pras Michel (2007)
"Girls & Rock 'N' Roll" feat Lazee (2010)
"Your World Is Mine" (2012)
"Dare To Change The World" feat MC Lyte (2018)

References

Mexican emigrants to Sweden
Singers from Stockholm
Singers from Mexico City
1972 births
Living people
Denise Lopez (Swedish singer) albums
21st-century Mexican singers
21st-century Swedish singers
21st-century Swedish women singers
Melodifestivalen contestants of 2003